Matthew Graham Pardoe (born 5 January 1991) is an English cricketer. A left-handed opening/middle order batsman, he played for Worcestershire.

In Birmingham league cricket, Pardoe plays for Kidderminster Victoria. He went to Haybridge High School and having progressed through Worcestershire's academy system and played for Worcestershire's Second XI, Pardoe made his first-class debut against Yorkshire at New Road, Worcester at the start of the 2011 season, scoring 26 and 0. In his second first-class match, against Warwickshire at New Road, he scored 54, his maiden first-class half-century. He went on to make his second half century against Nottinghamshire finishing on 74 before being caught off the bowling of Samit Patel.

Pardoe scored his maiden first-class century against Glamorgan in a county championship game in 2013 scoring 102 off 235 balls before being caught off the bowling of Dean Cosker.

He plays Minor Counties cricket for Herefordshire, and in 2017 was county captain.

References

External links
 

1991 births
English cricketers
Worcestershire cricketers
Living people
Sportspeople from Stourbridge
English cricketers of the 21st century
Herefordshire cricketers